Jaren Walter Jackson Jr. (born September 15, 1999) is an American professional basketball player for the Memphis Grizzlies of the National Basketball Association (NBA). He played college basketball for the Michigan State Spartans. He was selected by Memphis with the fourth overall pick of the 2018 NBA draft. In 2023, he was named to his first All-Star team.

High school career
Jackson started his high school career with Park Tudor School in Indianapolis. He played varsity for three years, where he averaged 10 points, 6 rebounds and 3 blocks per game. Jackson won two IHSAA state basketball championships while at Park Tudor. He  was teammates with future Xavier University standout and future professional basketball player Trevon Bluiett. He then transferred to La Lumiere School in La Porte, Indiana for his senior year, where he met Jordan Poole and started for their varsity squad.

Recruiting
Jackson was considered one of the top players in the 2017 graduating class. Scout.com ranked Jackson the 5th best player nationally, 1st at his position and 2nd overall in the Midwest region. 247 Sports ranked him 7th nationally, being 4th in his position. ESPN ranked him 8th in the ESPN 100, being 2nd in his position and 2nd regionally. 

Jackson was recruited by a number of notable programs, including Michigan State, Notre Dame, Butler, Indiana, Purdue, Maryland, and several more. He was invited to partake in the McDonald's All-American Game played on March 29, 2017.

College career
On September 15, 2016, Jaren Jackson Jr. announced his intentions to play for Tom Izzo at Michigan State. He signed the letter of intent on November 9, 2016. Jackson would make his collegiate debut on November 10, 2017, recording 13 points and a season-high 13 rebounds in a blowout 98–66 win over the North Florida Ospreys. Four days later, he would record a then-season-high 19 points in an 88–81 loss to the #1 ranked Duke Blue Devils. On December 5, Jackson would put up 11 points and a career-high 8 blocks in a 62–52 win over the Rutgers Scarlet Knights. Four days later, he would record 17 points and another career-high 13 rebounds in a blowout 88–63 win over the Southern Utah Thunderbirds. On January 22, 2018, Jackson recorded a then-season-high 21 points to go with 11 rebounds and 6 blocks in an 87–74 win over the Illinois Fighting Illini. On February 13, he would put up a career-high 27 points in a blowout 87–57 win over the Minnesota Golden Gophers. At the end of the regular season for Michigan State, he would be named both the Big Ten's Defensive Player of the Year, Freshman of the Year,  Big Ten's All-Freshman Team, and the All-Big Ten's Third Team. On April 2, Jackson would declare his entry into the 2018 NBA draft, where he was considered a potential top-tier lottery selection.

Professional career

Memphis Grizzlies (2018–present)

2018–2021: Early years 
On June 21, 2018, Jackson was selected with the fourth overall pick by the Memphis Grizzlies in the 2018 NBA draft. On July 1, 2018, he signed a multi-year, rookie scale contract with the Grizzlies. On March 29, 2019, Jackson was shut down for the remainder of the season due to a deep bruise to his right thigh.

On December 13, 2019, Jackson scored a career high 43 points, including 9 three pointers (which tied a franchise record set by Mike Miller in 2007) in a 127–114 loss to the Milwaukee Bucks.  On January 30, 2020, Jackson was suspended for one game without pay for leaving the bench during an altercation between the Grizzlies and the New York Knicks. On January 28, Jackson recorded a career high 7 blocks in a 104–96 win over the Denver Nuggets.

On August 4, 2020, Jackson suffered a torn meniscus in his left knee in a 99–109 loss to the New Orleans Pelicans hosted in the Bubble and was expected to miss the remainder of the 2019–20 season.

On December 16, 2020, the Grizzlies announced that they had exercised the team option on Jackson. On April 21, 2021, Jackson made his return, putting up 15 points, 8 rebounds, and 4 blocks in a loss to the Los Angeles Clippers. Two days later, Jackson scored a season-high 23 points in a 130–128 win over the Portland Trail Blazers. After a series of play-in tournament wins, the Grizzlies qualified for the playoffs for the first time since 2017. They faced the top-seeded Utah Jazz during their first round series. On May 31, Jackson scored a postseason career-high 21 points in a 120–113 Game 4 loss. The Grizzlies would eventually lose the series in five games.

2021–present: First All-Defensive and All-Star selections 
On October 18, 2021, Jackson signed a four-year, $105 million extension with the Grizzlies. On January 9, 2022, Jackson scored 21 points and tied a career-high with 12 rebounds in a 127–119 win over the Los Angeles Lakers. On April 16, during Game 1 of the first round of the playoffs, Jackson logged 12 points and seven blocks in a 130–117 loss to the Minnesota Timberwolves. His seven blocks set a Grizzlies franchise record for most blocks in a playoff game, surpassing Marc Gasol's 6 on May 13, 2013. The Grizzlies eventually defeated the Timberwolves in six games, with Jackson recording 18 points, 14 rebounds and two blocks in a 114–106 Game 6 win. During the Grizzlies' second-round series, they faced the Golden State Warriors. On May 1, Jackson scored a playoff career-high 33 points, alongside ten rebounds, in a 117–116 Game 1 loss. The Grizzlies wound up losing the series in six games to the Warriors, who went on to win the NBA Finals. Jackson finished the 2021–22 season leading the NBA in blocks per game at 2.3 and finished with the most blocks that season with 177 blocks, 40 more than the second place finisher. For his efforts, he was named to the NBA All-Defensive First Team and finished fifth in Defensive Player of the Year voting.

On June 30, 2022, Jackson underwent surgery to repair a stress fracture in his right foot and was ruled out for four-to-six months. After missing the first 14 games of the 2022–23 season, he made his season debut on November 15, recording seven points, six rebounds and five blocks in a 113–102 loss to the New Orleans Pelicans. On December 12, Jackson recorded a career-high eight blocks, alongside 15 points, seven rebounds and two assists, in a 128–103 win over the Atlanta Hawks. On January 5, 2023, he scored a season-high 31 points, alongside ten rebounds and three blocks, in a 123–115 win over the Orlando Magic. On February 2, Jackson was selected to his first NBA All-Star Game as a reserve forward for the Western Conference.

National team career
Jackson helped the United States of America's under-17 basketball team win the gold medal at the FIBA 2016 World Championships; in which he scored two points and had six rebounds. He averaged 4.3 points, 5.2 rebounds, 1.2 blocked shots, and shot 53 percent from the field. He was a member of the USA Junior National Select Team that participated in the 2017 Nike Hoop Summit in Portland, Oregon. Coming off the bench, Jackson tallied 13 points and a game-high nine rebounds in 25 minutes of play.

Career statistics

NBA

Regular season

|-
| style="text-align:left;"| 
| style="text-align:left;"| Memphis
| 58 || 56 || 26.1 || .506 || .359 || .766 || 4.7 || 1.1 || .9 || 1.4 || 13.8
|-
| style="text-align:left;"| 
| style="text-align:left;"| Memphis
| 57 || 57 || 28.5 || .469 || .394 || .747 || 4.6 || 1.4 || .7 || 1.6 || 17.4
|-
| style="text-align:left;"| 
| style="text-align:left;"| Memphis
| 11 || 4 || 23.5 || .424 || .283 || .833 || 5.6 || 1.1 || 1.1 || 1.6 || 14.4
|-
| style="text-align:left;"| 
| style="text-align:left;"| Memphis
| 78 || 78 || 27.3 || .415 || .319 || .823 || 5.8 || 1.1 || .9 ||style="background:#cfecec;"| 2.3* || 16.3
|- class="sortbottom"
| style="text-align:center;" colspan="2"| Career
| 204 || 195 || 27.1 || .453 || .351 || .791 || 5.1 || 1.2 || .9 || 1.8 || 15.8
|- class="sortbottom"
| style="text-align:center;" colspan="2"|All-Star
| 1 || 0 || 7.9 || .750 || .000 || – || 1.0 || .0 || .0 || .0 || 6.0

Playoffs

|-
| style="text-align:left;"|2021
| style="text-align:left;"|Memphis
| 5 || 5 || 27.4 || .426 || .286 || .875 || 5.6 || 1.0 || 1.0 || 1.2 || 13.6
|-
| style="text-align:left;"|2022
| style="text-align:left;"|Memphis
| 12 || 12 || 27.7 || .378 || .375 || .755 || 6.8 || .9 || .8 || 2.5 || 15.4
|- class="sortbottom"
| style="text-align:center;" colspan="2"| Career
| 17 || 17 || 27.6 || .390 || .350 || .783 || 6.4 || .9 || .8 || 2.1 || 14.9

College

|-
| style="text-align:left;"| 2017–18
| style="text-align:left;"| Michigan State
| 33 || 32 || 22.2 || .520 || .396 || .797 || 5.8 || 1.2 || .6 || 3.2 || 11.3

Personal life
He is the son of former professional basketball coach and former NBA player Jaren Jackson and WNBPA executive director Terri Jackson.

References

External links

Michigan State Spartans bio
USA Basketball bio

1999 births
Living people
African-American basketball players
American men's basketball players
Basketball players from Indianapolis
Centers (basketball)
La Lumiere School alumni
McDonald's High School All-Americans
Memphis Grizzlies draft picks
Memphis Grizzlies players
Michigan State Spartans men's basketball players
Park Tudor School alumni
21st-century African-American sportspeople